Gyeongmyeong of Silla (died 924) (r. 917–924) was the 54th ruler of the Korean kingdom of Silla. He was the eldest son of King Sindeok and Princess Uiseong. He ruled during the Later Three Kingdoms period, when much of his country's former domain was divided between Hubaekje and Taebong.

In 918, Wang Geon overthrew Gung Ye, who had been the ruler of Taebong, and established Goryeo. Gyeongmyeong joined forces with him in 920, and their allied armies were able to repel a Hubaekje assault on Daeya Castle. However, after this many border commanders chose to desert Silla in favor of Later Goguryeo, so Gyeongmyeong was left no better off than before.

King Gyeongmyeong sought to get aid from Tang China, and sent missions bearing tribute, but was unsuccessful.

After his death in 924, King Gyeongmyeong was buried to the north of Hwangboksa temple.

Family 
Parents
Father: Sindeok of Silla (died 917) 
Grandfather: Park Ye–gyeom (박예겸) or Park Moon-won
Grandmother: Madame Jeonghwa (정화부인)
Mother: Queen Uiseong of the Kim clan (의성왕후 김씨)
Maternal Grandfather: Heongang of Silla
Maternal Grandmother: Lady Uimyeong (의명부인)
Consorts and their respective issue:
Queen Kim, of the Kim clan (왕비 김씨), daughter of Jang Sataek (장사택)
Son: Grand Prince Bak  Eon-chim of Milseong ( 밀성대군 박언침)–the founder of Miryang Park clan
Son: Grand Prince Bak Eon‐Seong of Goyang (고양대군 박언성)–the founder of the Goryeong Park clan
Son:  Grand Prince Bak Eon-shin of Sogham (속함대군 박언신) –the founder of Hamyang Park clan
Son: Grand Prince Eunnip of Juksan (죽성대군 박언립)–the founder of Juksan Park Clan
Son: Grand Prince Bak Eon-chang  of Husabeol (후사벌대군 박언창)-–the founder of Sangju Park clan
Son: Grand Prince Eon-hwa of Wansan( 완산대군 박언화) – the founder of Jeonju Park clan and  Muan Park clan 
Son: Grand Prince Bak Eon-nji of  Gangnam (강남대군 박언지)– the founder of Suncheon Park clan 
Son: Grand Prince Bak Eon-ui of Wolseong (월성대군 박언의)–the founder of Wolseong Park clan

See also
List of Korean monarchs
List of Silla people
Later Three Kingdoms of Korea

References

Silla rulers
Silla Buddhists
Korean Buddhist monarchs
924 deaths
10th-century rulers in Asia
Year of birth unknown